Sara Kristina Edwardsson (born 24 June 1971 in Uppsala) is a Swedish actress, TV-host and singer.

Edwardsson hosts, among other programmes, Bolibompa and Världens största kör, and played Supersnällasilversara, Supersurasunksara and Stuntstina in Supersnällasilversara och Stålhenrik and Superhjältejul. She was host of the music show Musikbyrån from 1996 to 1998.

On scene, she has, among other things, played Hedvig in Från A till Ö. From the fall of 2008, she was seen again as a host of kids' TV program Bolibompa. Edwardsson has been singer in the group Le Fox releasing the album P-e-o-p-l-e-g-e-t-h-a-p-p-y.

Discography

Albums
as part of Le Fox
P-e-o-p-l-e-g-e-t-h-a-p-p-y
solo

References

External links

Sara Edwardsson on Swedish Film Database

1971 births
Swedish actresses
Living people
Swedish television hosts
21st-century Swedish singers
21st-century Swedish women singers
Swedish women television presenters